This is a timeline of the Lý dynasty, which ruled Đại Cồ Việt (1009–1054), and then the renamed Đại Việt (1054–1226).

11th century

12th century

13th century

References

Bibliography

 
*

History of Vietnam